The Drag River is a river in the municipalities of Minden Hills and Dysart et al in  Haliburton County, Southern Ontario, Canada. It is in the Great Lakes Basin and is a right tributary of the Burnt River.

Course
The Burnt River flows Kawartha Lakes and the Trent River to Lake Ontario.

See also  
List of rivers of Ontario

References

Sources

Rivers of Haliburton County